Nitty may refer to:

Nitty
Nitty (musician), American male pop-rap artist
Nitty Scott, MC, American female singer
Nitty Singh, New York Buzz tennis team owner
Nitty Kutchie, reggae singer Riddim Driven: Blindfold
"Flip and Nitty", song by Phil Spector Zip-a-Dee-Doo-Dah

See also

Netty (disambiguation)
Nitta (disambiguation)
Nittei
Nitti (disambiguation)
Nitto (disambiguation)
Nitty-gritty (disambiguation)